Miguel Alberto Amaya (born November 23, 1964) is a former Argentine footballer, who played for clubs from Argentina, Chile and Bolivia.

References
 Profile at BDFA 
 Profile at Futbol XXI 

1964 births
Living people
Argentine footballers
Argentine expatriate footballers
Gimnasia y Tiro footballers
Club Atlético Belgrano footballers
San Martín de Tucumán footballers
C.D. Jorge Wilstermann players
The Strongest players
Deportes Temuco footballers
Chilean Primera División players
Argentine Primera División players
Expatriate footballers in Chile
Expatriate footballers in Bolivia
Sportspeople from Tucumán Province
Talleres de Perico footballers
Association football forwards
Club Atlético Patronato managers